The 32nd government of Turkey (6 March 1970 – 26 March 1971) was a government in the history of Turkey. It is also called the third Demirel government.

Background 
Justice Party (AP) had the majority in the parliament, but largely because of a split in the party, the prime minister Süleyman Demirel failed to receive the confidence vote in the interpellation voting on 11 February 1970. However, AP still had the majority, and Demirel founded the next government as well. The cabinet was almost the same as that of the previous government.

The government
In the list below, the serving period of cabinet members who served only a part of the cabinet's lifespan are shown in the column "Notes".

Aftermath
In the early 1970s, Turkey was faced with extensive urban guerrilla activities. On 12 March 1971, the army forced Demirel to resign, claiming that the government was unable to halt the terrorism. However, parliament was still functioning, so Demirel and his colleagues in the cabinet were still active as MPs.

References

Cabinets of Turkey
Justice Party (Turkey) politicians
1970 establishments in Turkey
1971 disestablishments in Turkey
Cabinets established in 1970
Cabinets disestablished in 1971
Members of the 32nd government of Turkey
14th parliament of Turkey
Justice Party (Turkey)